Clear Fork is a stream in Clackamas County, in the U.S. state of Oregon.

See also
 List of rivers of Oregon

References

Rivers of Clackamas County, Oregon
Rivers of Oregon